Galeodes blanchardi is a species of solifuges or sun spiders.

Description
These spiders show long hairy appendages. Like other solifuges, they are mainly nocturnal.

Distribution and habitat
This species can be found in arid areas in Algeria, Libya, Morocco, Togo and Tunisia.

References

Solifugae
Arachnids of Africa
Animals described in 1891